Porur is a neighbourhood of Chennai, India. It is situated in the Maduravoyal taluk of Chennai district in the southern part of the city. Since 2011, it has been a part of the Chennai Corporation and included in zone number 11.

The earliest recorded history of Porur goes back to the Chola period when it served as the headquarters of an administrative division (nadu) called Perur Nadu. Porur Lake is the major source of fresh water for suburban areas such as Iyyapanthangal, Moulivakkam and Mangadu. Porur is also known for the Ramachandra Medical College. Porur houses Mono-pulse Secondary Surveillance radar, one of the two radars in the city, which aids air-transport communication.

Location 
Porur is located at 13.03° N and 80.16° E, and 52 feet (15 metres) above sea level. It is bounded on the east and south-east by the Pallavaram Hills.

History 
Porur was a little-known village administered as a part of the Saidapet taluk of the then Chengalpattu district in 1961. During that time, the Saidapet taluk adjoining Madras city, especially the Mount-Poonamallee Road, was famous for industries and chemical plants producing a variety of products.

Porur village panchayat was upgraded to a Grade-I town panchayat on October 1, 1977. Later, it was upgraded to a selection grade town panchayat starting from February 24, 1982. The population of the town at the time of the 1981 census was 8,633.

Demographics 

 India census, Porur had a population of 28,782. Males constitute 52% of the population and females 48%. Porur has an average literacy rate of 79%, higher than the national average of 59.5%: male literacy is 83%, and female literacy is 76%. In Porur, 9% of the population is under 6 years of age. Population of Porur was 30,060 in 2011. The sex ratio was 938 females for every 1000 males. Porur is now administered by the Greater Chennai Corporation.

Education 
 Government Boys' School, Porur
 Government High School Karambakkam, Porur
 Government Girls Higher Secondary School, Porur
 Faith Home Middle School, Porur
 Grace School, Porur (established 1989)
 St John's Matriculation and Higher Secondary School
 Sri Ramachandra Institute of Higher Education and Research, Porur

Temples 
1. Ramanatheswarar Temple, Porur, Chennai
The idol worshipped in this temple is Shivan who is believed to be taken his form as Ramanatheshwarar with his consort Sivakama Sundari. The temple is so sacred that it is also considered as Uttara Rameshwaram. This means those who desire to worship the lord in Rameshwaram but is unable to travel can seek his blessings from here. This temple is believed to be built during the period of Cholas. The sthala puranam states that Lord Rama worshipped the Shiva idol here while on his way to search Lady Sita who was captured by Lankapathi Ravan.

2. Shivan Temple
This temple is called Sri Adi Kubera Jalakandeswarar temple initially. However, the locals call it the Porur Shivan temple. The temple is located right next to the Porur lake and has a good view. This temple is particularly crowded on pradosham and is believed to have a very sacred significance.
Temple Timings – 06:00 AM to 11:30 AM / 05:00 PM to 08:30 PM
Address –  Mount Poonamalle High Rd, Porur Lake, Jaya Nagar, Porur, Chennai, Tamil Nadu 600116

3. Bala Murugan Temple
This Murugan temple is also called Baala Murugan Temple and is located in the Easwaran Koil Street of Porur. The idol worshipped here is Lord Murugan. It is Porur’s biggest standalone temple. It is very auspicious to visit this temple on Sashti and Karthigai.

4. Sethu Kshetram

This temple was constructed in the year 1964. It is said that Shri Shankaracharya of Shringeri has laid the foundation for the temple construction. The WS industries built it. The main deity here is Lord Ganesh. However, there are also smaller sanctum sanctorum for Lord Ayyappa, Lord Shiva, Lord Rama and Lord Hanuman. There are also shrines for Shiridi Baba and SatyaSai Baba.

5. Kamatchi Amman Temple

Goddess Kamakshi is the form of Lalitha Maha Thripurasundari. She is considered to be the goddess who is equal in stature to Lord Shiva. Kamakshi Amman is worshipped widely across the state and is a primary deity in goddesses. The Kamatchi Amman temple in Porur is located in Lakshmi Nagar. Devotees believe that the temple is very auspicious and will help you get out of any agony.

Entertainment 
GK Cinemas is one of the popular theatre in this locality. Also, Super Saravana stores opened in this area for shopping.

Notes 

Neighbourhoods in Chennai